Karl Kerbach (30 September 1918 – 28 November 1994) was an Austrian footballer. He played in one match for the Austria national football team in 1946.

References

External links
 

1918 births
1994 deaths
Austrian footballers
Austria international footballers
Place of birth missing
Association footballers not categorized by position